Chip shot may refer to:

 Chip (golf),  a golf shot also known as half-swing
 Chip (association football), an association football shot also known as a lob
 Chip shot (gridiron football), a short field goal attempt in gridiron football
 Chip (curling), a takeout shot striking a rock at an angle
 Chip shot (idiom), a phrase denoting that an attempted action has a low degree of difficulty

See also 
 Chip (disambiguation)